

Onslow is a coastal town in the Pilbara region of Western Australia,  north of Perth. It has a population of 848 people and is located within the Shire of Ashburton local government area.

The town is served by Onslow Airport, and is located 76 km off of the North West Coastal Highway.

History

Onslow was gazetted on 26 October 1885 as a town to serve the port at Ashburton Roads, at the mouth of the Ashburton River, exporting wool from sheep stations of the Pilbara hinterland. It was named after the then Chief Justice of Western Australia, Sir Alexander Onslow (1842–1908).

Wool continued to be the major industry for the next eighty years, despite the extremes of drought and flood that characterize the region and are related to the passage or absence of cyclones.

Although a large jetty was built at the original site of Onslow (Old Onslow), repeated cyclone damage and the silting up of the river caused increasing problems with the loading and unloading of visiting ships. The cargo was transferred by lighter from the ship in Ashburton Roads to the jetty, then by horse-tram from the jetty across  of marshland inland to the town. The new townsite was gazetted on 10 January 1924, and the residents of Old Onslow moved across in 1925. The new location for Onslow's jetty was better protected from storm damage with the townsite more conveniently located on the coast.

On 15 May 1943, Onslow became the most southerly town in Australia to be bombed by Imperial Japan in World War II, when a single plane bombed the airfield. However, there was no damage or casualties.

Since the war, the declining purchasing power of wool has, despite consistently good rainfall on the inland sheep stations since the late 1960s, led to a change in focus of Onslow's economy from wool to tourism. It is an access point for Coral Coast activities, such as scuba diving on the coral reefs offshore from the town.

Climate
Onslow has a hot desert climate (BWh) having very little year round rainfall with most of it falling in the first half of the year. Only a few months have average highs below 27 °C (80.6 °F). Onslow registered the joint highest temperature ever recorded in Australia (along with Oodnadatta in January 1960) at 50.7 °C (123 °F) on 13 January 2022.

During Onslow's long history, the town has gone through the extremes of heatwaves, heavy rains and cyclones. For example, in 1912, Onslow received only  of rainfall and during 1935-36 combined only  fell.  
While in 1961 a record  was recorded, most of which fell between late January and early March, a result of three cyclone impacts within five weeks. These cyclones brought heavy rain and destructive winds to Onslow, resulting in flooding and damage to buildings.
A major long-term drought between 1935 and 1941, during which time only one cyclone hit (in April 1937) and did not produce rain on the inland sheep stations, led to a decline in Onslow's fortunes.

Cyclones
Numerous cyclones have impacted Onslow over the years, the first recorded by white colonists was in 1880. On 28 March 1934, a severe cyclone hit the town, with the new jetty nearly destroyed. All the buildings suffered damage, with some destroyed. Another severe cyclone crossed the coast at Onslow on 7 February 1963, damaging nearly every building in town. On 19 February 1975, Severe Tropical Cyclone Trixie crossed the coast near Onslow, with the cyclone's centre passing directly over nearby Mardie. At the time, the wind gust recorded at Onslow was the highest recorded in Australia.

See also
 Pilbara historical timeline
 Pilbara newspapers
 List of extreme temperatures in Australia

References

Further reading
 Webb, Martyn and Audrey (1983) Edge of Empire Artlook Books

External links
 Onslow Information  

Shire of Ashburton
Coastal towns in Western Australia
North West Shelf